An Unreasonable Man is a 2006 documentary film that traces the life and career of political activist Ralph Nader, the founder of modern consumer protection in America and perennial presidential candidate. Contrary to the title's apparent message, the film was actually created to defend Nader and restore his reputation after his controversial role in the 2000 U.S. presidential election.

Besides featuring Mr. Nader himself, the film presents interviews with current and former members of Nader's Raiders, including Joan Claybrook and Robert Fellmeth, as well as political commentators such as Phil Donahue, Pat Buchanan, and Eric Alterman. The film takes its name from the George Bernard Shaw quotation, "The reasonable man adapts himself to the world; the unreasonable one persists in trying to adapt the world to himself. Therefore all progress depends on the unreasonable man."

Summary 
The first half of the film examines Nader's advocacy for auto safety features, such as federally mandated seat belts and air bags, as well as his rise to national prominence following an invasion of privacy lawsuit against General Motors. It also examines the formation of independent advocacy groups (termed "Nader's Raiders") during the 1970s; organizations which carried out independent research on various federal agencies, such as the Federal Trade Commission and the Food and Drug Administration. Over the next thirty years, the film argues, Nader "built a legislative record that would be the envy of any modern president."

The second half of the film traces Nader's shift to a grassroots form of organizing focused on citizen power, including his disillusionment with the two-party system following the rise of Reaganism. The film examines Nader's effect as a third party candidate on the results of the controversial 2000 presidential election.

Response
The documentary has an aggregate of 92 percent based on 63 reviews on Rotten Tomatoes and a score of 75 percent based on 24 review on Metacritic.

Festival screenings
Meaford International Film Festival 2007
Sundance Film Festival

Notes

External links

An Unreasonable Man site for Independent Lens on PBS

 

An Unreasonable Man trailer (YouTube)

2006 films
Biographical documentary films
American documentary films
Ralph Nader
Works about consumer protection
Documentary films about American politicians
Films about activists
2000s English-language films
2000s American films